Georgius is a masculine given name, the Latin form of the Greek name Γεώργιος Georgios; its English equivalent is George. Notable people with the name include:

 Georgius Choeroboscus (7th century), Greek educator
 Georgius Tzul (11th century), Khazar warlord
 Georgius Merula (c. 1430–1494), Italian humanist and classical scholar
 Georgius Agricola (1494–1555), German scholar and scientist, and the 'father of mineralogy'
 Georgius Calixtus (1586–1656), German Lutheran theologian
 Georgius (1891-1970), French songwriter & actor

See also
George (disambiguation)

Masculine given names